The humpback smooth-hound (Mustelus whitneyi) is a houndshark of the family Triakidae.

Description
It has a sturdy body with a moderately long, broad, sharply angled snout and large eyes, set widely apart. The mouth is fairly long and the upper lip furrows are longer than the lower ones. The teeth have a main pointed cusp and sometimes smaller subsidiary ones. The first dorsal fin is approximately triangular and the trailing edge is fringed with bare, dark-coloured collagen rods known as ceratotrichia. The pectoral fins are large and the pelvic fins moderately so. The caudal peduncle is short and the lower lobe of the tail fin is hardly curved in adults. The colour of this shark is plain grey or greyish-brown without any spots or barring.

Distribution
It is found near the seabed, often on rocky shores, where it feeds on small fish and crustaceans such as crabs and mantis shrimps.

Status
The humpback smooth-hound is fished for human consumption in Chile but more particularly in Peru, where it is more common. Along with the spotted houndshark (Triakis maculata) and the speckled smooth-hound (Mustelus mento) it is known as "tollo" in its local fisheries, and of the three species it is the humpback smooth-hound that is the main target of the tollo fishery in Peru. Landings averaging 11,000 tons of tollo per year were made in that country between 1965 and 1989, but quantities caught diminished thereafter. The International Union for Conservation of Nature (IUCN) has rated the status of the humpback smooth-hound as being critically endangered due to overexploitation.

References

External links

 

humpback smooth-hound
Western South American coastal fauna
humpback smooth-hound